Soothradharan is a 2001 Indian Malayalam-language film written and directed by A. K. Lohithadas. The film stars Dileep and Meera Jasmine, while Bindu Panicker, Kalabhavan Mani and Cochin Haneefa play other important roles.
Music of the movie was done by Raveendran master. This was the debut film of actress Meera Jasmine. Bindu Panicker and Haneefa won Second Best Actress and Second Best Actor Awards at the Kerala State Film Awards of India.

Plot
Ramesan who supports the five member family by selling pickles and other eatables, reaches a border town named Pandavapuram under certain circumstances where he finds the conditions to be truly stark and dreary. Director dwells upon the ordeals of life in Pandavapuram. Ramesan is trying in vain to find his friend Leelakrishnan who acts as a hijada to eke out a living.

Devumma who runs a brothel gives him shelter. Seemingly oblivious of the impending doom, Sivani a teenage girl lives with Devumma  and Raniamma She falls in love with Ramesan. Bharathiyakka, an old inmate of the whorehouse fills her wallet with money earned by selling virgins to infamous pimps. She persuades Devumma to sell Sivani to a rich and pompous Zamindar Trapped between dreams of hard cash for sustenance and her affection for Sivani, Devumma is trying to save the lives of prostitutes by getting as much money as she can through this ordeal. Sivani's aspirations bite the dust leaving her emotionally shattered, when Devumma decides to sell her. But then matters are put in their proper perspective and the director opts for the usual happy ending.

Cast
 Dileep as Rameshan 
 Meera Jasmine as Shivani
 Bindu Panicker as Devumma (Devayani)
 Kalabhavan Mani as Sadanandan
 Cochin Haneefa as Rajamani 
 Salim Kumar as Leela Krishnan 
Chithra as Raniamma
Kanakadurga as Bharathi akka
Mansoor Ali Khan as Kannappa Chettiyar
Mahesh

Songs

Film had notable songs composed by Raveendran Master and lyrics penned by S. Rameshan Nair.

Awards

References

External links
 

2001 films
2000s Malayalam-language films
Films about prostitution in India
Films with screenplays by A. K. Lohithadas
Films directed by A. K. Lohithadas
Films scored by Raveendran